Eskanlou-e Sofla (also Romanized as Eskānloū-e Soflá; also known as Īdahlū) is a village in Bastamlu Rural District, in the Central District of Khoda Afarin County, East Azerbaijan Province, Iran. It has a population of 1,800 and 180 families during the 2006 census.

References

External links

Populated places in Khoda Afarin County